Embourgeoisement is the theory that posits the migration of individuals into the bourgeoisie as a result of their own efforts or collective action, such as that taken by unions in the United States and elsewhere in the 1930s to the 1960s that established middle class-status for factory workers and others that would not have been considered middle class by their employments. This process allowed increasing numbers of what might traditionally be classified as working-class people to assume the lifestyle and individualistic values of the so-called middle classes and hence reject commitment to collective social and economic goals. The opposite process is proletarianization. Sociologist John Goldthorpe disputed the embourgeoisement thesis in 1967.

Background
Charles E. Hurst 

describes this change to be a result of the  post-industrialization of society, in which there are far fewer manual labor jobs, which is the main classification of blue-collar work.  With post-industrialization, former upper-level blue-collar workers are moving to white-collar work because of the decreased availability and prestige of manual labor jobs.  Even when their actual jobs do not change, their lifestyles based on their job situation often change into a lifestyle that according to Mayer and Buckley, more closely resembles the lower-middle class than the rest of the lower blue-collar workers.  The result of this idea of embourgeoisement is that more people are incorporated into the middle-class.  As a result, there is decreased class consciousness and declining working class solidarity

.  This in turn could lead to less group action among the lower class if trying to get more rights or changes within their job field. 
The topic was widely discussed in academic circles in the 1960s following the publication of The Affluent Worker in the Class Structure  by John H. Goldthorpe in 1963.

The situation in Great Britain at the time is described in the book Must Labour Lose?, written by Mark Abrams and Richard Rose.

See also
Classless society
Class consciousness
False consciousness
Proletarianization

References

External links
  entry at the University of Canterbury Glossary of Sociological Terms

Sociological theories
Social status
Bourgeoisie